Holt is a market town, civil parish and electoral ward in the English county of Norfolk. The town has a population of 3,550, rising and including the ward to 3,810 at the 2011 census. Holt is within the area covered by North Norfolk District Council. Holt has a heritage railway station; it is the south-western terminus of the preserved North Norfolk Railway, known as the Poppy Line.

History

Origins
The most likely derivation of the name Holt is from an Anglo-Saxon word for woodland, and Holt is located on wooded high ground of the Cromer-Holt ridge at the crossing point of two ancient by-ways and as such was a natural point for a settlement to grow. The town has a mention in the great survey of 1086 known as the Domesday Book. In the survey it is described as a market town and a port with the nearby port of Cley next the Sea being described as Holt's port. It also had five watermills and twelve plough teams and as such was seen as a busy thriving viable settlement. The first Lord of the Manor was Walter Giffard; it passed to Hugh, Earl of Chester, who then left it to the De Vaux family. By this time Holt had a well-established market and two annual fairs which were held on 25 April and 25 November. Over the years Holt grew as a local place of trade and commerce. The weekly market which had taken place since before the 1080s was stopped in the 1960s.

Great fire
On 1 May 1708, Holt was devastated by a fire which destroyed most of the medieval town in three hours. The fire started at Shirehall Plain and quickly spread through the timber houses of the town. The church was also badly damaged with its thatched chancel destroyed, the lead melted from the windows and the flames spreading up the steeple. Contemporary reports stated that the fire spread so swiftly that the butchers did not have time to rescue their meat from their stalls on the market. The damage to the town was estimated to be in the region of £11,000. The town subsequently received many donations from all over the country to aid reconstruction.

Georgian Holt
With most of the medieval buildings destroyed, the rebuilding made Holt notable for its abundance of Georgian buildings, that being the style of the day. However, the town repaired and retains its Norman parish church, which is dedicated to St Andrew.

1968 RAF mid-air collision
A mid-air collision over the town occurred on the night of 19 August 1968, involving a Victor Tanker from RAF Marham and a Canberra bomber from RAF Bruggen in West Germany. This followed an electrical storm that had disabled radar systems. All seven airmen on board were killed. A memorial stone hangs inside Saint Andrew's Church.

Churches

The ancient Church of England parish church of Holt is dedicated to St Andrew the Apostle and probably has late Saxon origins. It was rebuilt in the early 14th century in the Decorated Gothic style by Sir William de Nerford and his wife Petronilla, daughter of John de Vaux, and a tower was added later in the same century. The church was thatched and was badly damaged in the great Holt fire of 1708. Between 1722 and 1727 it was rebuilt, with contributions from Lord Townshend, the Prince of Wales, and Robert Walpole. The church was restored between 1862 and 1874 by William Butterfield.

The Methodist Church, on Obelisk Plain, was built between 1862 and 1863 to a design by Thomas Jekyll, on a site donated by William Cozens-Hardy of Letheringsett Hall, who also paid most of the building costs.

The most recent religious building is the Chapel of Gresham's School, designed by Maxwell Ayrton and built in knapped flint and limestone between 1912 and 1916, with two angle turrets and an embattled parapet. This is now a Grade II listed building.

Education

Gresham's School
Gresham's School, a public school founded in 1555 by Sir John Gresham, originally for boys but co-educational since 1971, is located on the north side of the town.

The school's former pupils include Benjamin Britten, W. H. Auden, Lord Reith, Sir Alan Lloyd Hodgkin, President Erskine Childers, Sir Christopher Cockerell, Donald Maclean, Sir Lennox Berkeley, Sir Stephen Spender, Richard Hand, Tom Wintringham, Sir James Dyson, Ralph Firman, Sir Peter Brook, Paddy O'Connell, Sebastian Shaw, Olivia Colman, Sienna Guillory, John Tusa, Tom Youngs and Michael Cummings.

Other schools
Holt Community Primary School is a state primary school for children aged 4–11. The Infant School was built in 1910 with the Junior School being built by 1928. The Infant School and Junior School was amalgamated in 1965 to form Holt County Primary School. The school has been extended and developed over the years. It changed its name in 1999 to Holt Community Primary School.

There is no state secondary school in the town, so many children travel to Sheringham High School between the ages of 11 and 16.

Local points of interest

Holt Hall
The hall was built in the 1840s and extended in the 1860s. The hall is located in an  estate made up of ancient woodlands, lawns, lakes and gardens.

It was owned by Henry Burcham-Rogers, who inherited it from his father John Rogers in 1906. 
Henry Burcham-Rogers kept the hall until his death in 1945.

Holt Hall is currently a field studies centre run by Norfolk County Council.

Byfords
1–3 Shirehall Plain – The building is thought to be the oldest house in Holt (the cellar dates back to the 15th century), a survivor of the great fire of Holt in 1708 and a further fire in the building in 1906. The premises traded as a hardware shop or ironmonger's for over 100 years under the ownership of the Byford family. Byfords is now run as a café, delicatessen and B&B.

Blind Sam
Blind Sam is the name given locally to the Queen Victoria Jubilee Lantern located in Obelisk Plain. From the year of Victoria's Golden Jubilee in 1887 until 1921 it stood in the Market Place, where it had two functions, to provide light to the Market Place and to provide drinking water from two fountains at the bottom. The light was powered by the town's gas supply, which at the time was sporadic and unreliable, hence the nickname "Blind Sam". It was moved to Obelisk Plain in 1921 to make way for the war memorial. Made by ironmongers in Glasgow, it was restored in the 1990s.

Obelisk
The pineapple-topped obelisk at Holt is one of a pair of gateposts from Melton Constable Park, the other having been given to the town of Dereham in 1757. Each gatepost had the distances to various places from Holt and Dereham respectively carved into the stone. At the start of the Second World War, to avoid assisting the enemy in the event of invasion, the townspeople of Dereham dumped their obelisk down a deep well, where it remains to this day. The people of Holt whitewashed their obelisk at the start of the Second World War and it remains in good condition.

Water Tower
The town's water was pumped from the common land at Spout Hills to the water tower in Shirehall Plain. It held 15,000 gallons of water and the water level inside the tank could be read from the ground. The tower was in use until 1955 and was demolished in 1957.

Windmill
A brick-built windmill was erected in the late 18th century: when put up for sale in the summer of 1792 it was described as "newly built". It was used by many different owners until the early 1920s. The sails were removed in 1922 and the rest of the machinery was removed in the 1930s. The brick tower was then used for storage until deemed unsafe. The brick tower was demolished in the 1970s. There are now homes on the site, known as Mill Court.

Chapel Yard
Chapel Yard was developed in 1983 by Eric Goodman and Richard Webster from a combination of derelict flint workers cottages, a chapel, the old fire station, the reservists drill hall and the removal of 1950’s warehouses.

It was the first mayor development of retail space in the Georgian Market Town since the town was rebuilt after the Great Fire of Holt in 1708

The development was designed by Eric Goodman; the adaption of the buildings and introduction of new infill buildings combining traditional design with an innovative approach delivered a timeless built environment. The development delivered 14 new and renovated commercial outlets bringing an interactive retail and restaurant environment within the conservation zone.

Eric Goodman is further accredited with discovering during renovation works that cottages 3,4,5 and 6 Chapel Yard were from c1550. These are the oldest known buildings in the historic Market Towns’ conservation area and have been given grade II listed status since. The massive chimney breasts have pockets for drying grain. Corn was discovered in pots during renovation.

As part of the development Goodman created design assets to include two new buildings to bring character and a feeling of a timeless and traditional reasoning to the development by adapting a traditional Norfolk cart shed design with an innovative approach to a modern retail environment. The design assets included a large pan tile roof, Oak buttresses to support the roof and in-setting the retail apertures, doors and windows to provide a covered walkway/ terrace. It was also the first creation of a ‘Yard’ of shops which would later help to define new areas within the conservation zone as Holt adopted the reuse of small worker’s cottages and redundant land as retail areas for independent shops.

The development received awards in recognition of the contribution to conservation and improvement of the Town in 1983 which included:

The Norfolk Society, a Council for the Protection of Rural England Dated 21 March 1984. Certificate quote - ‘Redevelopment Chapel Yard, Albert Street, Holt, including reconstruction and conservation of old buildings and erection of new, all using mainly traditional materials, thereby giving character and vitality to an area under threat of dereliction. It is notable that no architectural help was involved’

Historic England also gave the buildings at 12 and 8 Albert Street Grade II listed status to protect the newly built environment which suggests Goodman may be the only known design [architect] in Norfolk to receive such an accolade for a new development in North Norfolk.  See - 2021 HOLT Conservation Appraisal and Management Plan [page 195].

The development did not receive The Graham Alan Award for Conservation from North Norfolk District Council directly. Mike Alan (son of the late Graham Alan had provided some consultation on the development, it was considered this could be contentious as the award was only in its second year). A letter of recognition from the Judges was received with thanks.

In 1986 A new supermarket, now Budgen’s was built in the Town’s conservation zone.

The architects for the project consulted with Goodman on the design of their scheme, adopting his design code into this development to create another adaptation of a ‘Norfolk cart shed’ to mirror those newly built in Chapel Yard. The development received the Graham Alan Award 1986.

The award is designed to reflect conservation and restoration of listed and unlisted buildings and for new buildings which, through their design, including the innovative use of traditional building forms and detailing which in this case have contributed to Holt’s built environment.

Graham Alan Award Winners.

Chapel Yard has provided a significant contribution in shaping Holt’s future over the last 40 years which has created a significant number of jobs in the small market town.

Further developments were to come over the years between 1995 to date which further adopted Goodman’s design code. Apple Yard by Ru Bruce-Lockhart, son of the former Gresham’s School headmaster. Goodman was consulted on the design of the scheme.

Other projects which adopted the design code: Lee’s Yard - Feather Yard - Hoppers Yard - Franklyn’s Yard

Chapel Yard is now referenced as part of the 2021 HOLT Conservation Appraisal and Management Plan [pages, 13, 16, 18, 43, 44, 67, 76, 86, 98, 99, 128, 195].

Goodman’s design code is accredited with providing North Norfolk District Council with the innovative approach to future Townscape since designing Chapel Yard in 1983 which blends seamlessly and innovatively with the former built environment of the Georgian Town.

In 2022 MP for North Norfolk - Duncan Baker - and former Mayor of Holt recommended Eric Goodman for an MBE in recognition of his unique and defining contribution to North Norfolk and stated ‘Mr Goodman designed and developed Chapel Yard in Holt, which has had a significant impact to North Norfolk…I am personally very grateful to Mr Goodman for all he has done for Holt and the wider community’.

Amenities

Holt Country Park
Holt Country Park is a short walk from the town. Its history includes a horseracing course, heath, farmland, forestry and woodland garden. It is now woodland dominated with Scots pine and native broadleaves. Its rich ground flora supports wildlife including deer. The park has achieved a Green Flag Award every year since 2005.

Holt Lowes

The poor of Holt had grazing rights for an animal and also had the right to take wood and gorse from the land for their own use. It is likely that the land was never used by the poor of Holt as the land was not wholly suitable. The Lowes was used for military training during the First World War. It is open to the public along with Holt Country Park. The Lowes has long been recognised as an important area for wildlife, with records going back to the 18th century. It was declared an SSSI in 1954 and for a while managed as a nature reserve by the Norfolk Wildlife Trust, which continues to act as managing agents for the trustees. As on all lowland heaths, there is a constant need for management to prevent the encroachment of trees. Recent work has concentrated on clearing a large part of the mixed valley mire, an area of sphagnum bog that supports plants like sundews and several species of dragonfly, including one, the keeled skimmer, found nowhere else in East Anglia.

Spout Hills
An old reservoir still exists but the pumping station was dismantled in the 1950s.

Bakers & Larners

Bakers & Larners is a department store located on Market Place. It has been continuously owned by the Baker family since the eighteenth century.

Transport

Railway
The nearest railway station to Holt is in the town of Sheringham, where access to the National Rail network is provided by the Bittern Line to Norwich. Services are generally hourly and are operated by Greater Anglia.

History

Holt's original railway station, which opened in 1887, was served by the Midland and Great Northern Railway. Most of this network was closed by British Railways in 1959, but the short section from Melton Constable via Holt to Sheringham (services continuing on to Cromer and Norwich) escaped closure for a few more years. It succumbed finally in 1964 when the branch was cut back to Sheringham, which is now the nearest national railway station. The station was later demolished and the site is now under the town's by-pass.

Heritage

In 1965, within a year of the closure of the line, the North Norfolk Railway was formed to restore part of the line as an independent heritage steam railway. Initially, it operated between Sheringham and Weybourne; later, it was extended to the eastern edge of Holt at a new station site. A horse-bus service, the Holt Flyer, once ran between the Railway Tavern in the town centre and the new railway station, timed to connect with trains; this has now been replaced by an AEC Routemaster bus.

Future ambitions
There are now plans by the Norfolk Orbital Railway to extend the railway back towards the town centre
and on to Melton Constable and Fakenham.

Buses
Several local bus routes operate in and around Holt, provided by Sanders Coaches.

Roads
The town is on the route of the A148 King's Lynn to Cromer road.

Air
Norwich International Airport is sited in the northern outskirts of the city.

Festivals and cultural events

Holt Summer Festival
The Holt Summer Festival started in 2009 is an arts festival. The event runs for a week and included music, theatre, literature, cinema and art.

Doctor Who events
On Sunday 25 June 2006, Holt was "invaded" by Daleks. The event was a celebration of BBC Television's classic science fiction series Doctor Who. The Doctor Who Midsummer Invasion attracted many fans of the ever-popular show to the town as well as some of its previous stars. Organised by Planet Skaro, a local sci-fi store that has subsequently closed, the highlight of the day was a Dalek parade through the town centre.

Due to the success of the first Invasion, another science fiction themed event took place in Holt on 30 June 2007.

Sport and recreation
Holt has a Rugby football club, formed in 1961. The club's first match was played against West Norfolk on Gresham's School playing field. In the early days the team used the White Lion Hotel (now closed) for their changing rooms and hospitality. In 1967 the club was able to purchase  of land on the eastern side of Bridge Road in nearby High Kelling. The club began playing their home games at their new facilities in 1969. At Bridge Road the club has three full-size pitches, six dedicated mini pitches and a clubhouse which was built in 1970. There are changing room facilities for up to 100 players. The club has three senior sides, a junior side and mini rugby sides for 6- to 12-year-olds.

Holt United Football Club was formed in 1894 and was a founder member of the North Norfolk and Norwich League, which began in 1895. In 1927 the club joined the Norwich and District League and went on to win this league on five occasions. In 1935 the club was in the Norfolk and Suffolk League and did not suffer a league defeat until December that year, when they lost to Norwich City A at Carrow Road. Holt was the first amateur team to play at the newly built Carrow Road ground. In 1985 Holt United left their ground at Jubilee Road, which was sold to finance the new Sports Centre complex on Kelling Road. For one season Holt played their matches at Gresham's School. In 1986 the club moved to their new ground at the Sports Centre. Four years later they dropped into junior football. During the past three seasons the club have remained in Division One of the Anglian Combination. At present Holt United runs three sides, the first team playing in the Anglian Combination and the Reserves and colts teams in the North East Norfolk League.

Holt Harlequins Hockey Club (formerly Cromer Hockey Club) plays at the astroturf ground at Gresham's School.

Holt has a King George's Field in memorial to King George V.

Notable people
Geoffrey Gillam (1905–1970), consultant cardiologist
Dr Thomas Girdlestone (1758–1822), physician
Sir John Gresham (1492–1556), merchant, founder of Gresham's School
Sir Richard Gresham (1494–1549), merchant and member of parliament
Billa Harrod (1911-2005), architectural conservationist
John Holmes (1703–1760), educationist
Logie Bruce Lockhart (born 1921 - 7 September 2020), writer and journalist
Robert Pilch (1877–1957), footballer
Sir Matthew Pinsent (born 1970), Olympic gold medallist in rowing
 Lewis Radford, Vicar of Holt, later Bishop of Goulburn in Australia 
Edmund Rogers (1823–1910), journalist and spiritualist
Sebastian Shaw (1905–1994), actor
Gareth Sibson (born 1977), writer and broadcaster
Sir William Stanley (1435–1495), soldier, Lord Chamberlain
Kieron Williamson (born 2002), landscape artist

See also
 List of closed railway stations in Britain

Bibliography
 Lewis Radford, History of Holt. A Brief Study of Parish, Church and School (Holt: Rounce & Wortley, 1908)
 Peter Brooks, Holt, Georgian Market Town (Cromer: Poppyland Publishing, second edition 2001)

References

External links

Holt Town Council

 
North Norfolk
Market towns in Norfolk
Towns in Norfolk
Civil parishes in Norfolk